Paul W. Faulkner (April 2, 1913 – January 5, 1997) was an American artist.

Early life
Born in North Platte, Nebraska, Faulkner received a bachelor's degree from the University of Nebraska and a master's degree from the Chicago Art Institute.

Career
Faulkner was an instructor at the Layton School of Art in Milwaukee, Wisconsin and at the Norwich Free Academy in Norwich, Connecticut. He also worked at the Smithsonian Institution in Washington, DC.

Faulkner painted post office murals as part of the New Deal. In 1940 he painted the fresco Winter Sports at the post office in Kewaunee, Wisconsin. It was based on an earlier design of his, with a local factory added to indicate its location. In 1943 he painted the a mural "Farm Scene" at the Clarion, Iowa post office.

Faulkner lived in Uncasville, Connecticut and died in Montville, Connecticut.

References

1913 births
1997 deaths
People from Montville, Connecticut
People from North Platte, Nebraska
Artists from Milwaukee
University of Nebraska alumni
School of the Art Institute of Chicago alumni
Painters from Connecticut
Artists from Nebraska
Painters from Nebraska
Painters from Wisconsin
Fresco painters
20th-century American painters
American male painters
American muralists
Smithsonian Institution people
People of the New Deal arts projects
20th-century American male artists